Joseph M. Tierney (January 1, 1941 – December 13, 2009) was an American politician who served as a member of the Boston City Council from 1972 to 1987. He was the President of the City Council in 1977, 1979, and from 1983 to 1985. He was a candidate for Mayor of Boston in 1987, losing to incumbent Raymond Flynn, 67% to 33%. He was the father of actress Maura Tierney.

References

External links
 
 Joseph M. Tierney Learning Center Ribbon Cutting via YouTube

Boston City Council members
1941 births
2009 deaths
20th-century American politicians
Massachusetts Democrats
Boston State College alumni
Suffolk University Law School alumni
Deaths from cancer in Massachusetts
People from Hyde Park, Boston